Josef "Joe" Rubinstein (born 4 June 1958) is a comic book artist and inker, most associated with inking Marvel Comics' The Official Handbook of the Marvel Universe and the 1982 four-issue Wolverine miniseries by Chris Claremont and Frank Miller. He is also known for giving artist Art Adams his first professional work.

Early life
Josef Rubinstein was born in Wrocław, Poland in 1958. He moved with his family to the United States, where he became a naturalized citizen in 1972.

Career
Rubinstein started his artist career in the early 1970s as a teenager. Primarily working as an inker, his artwork has been published by major U.S. comics publishers including Marvel Comics, DC Comics and Dark Horse Comics. However, he first entered the industry as an office assistant to Neal Adams and Dick Giordano at Continuity Associates. While working this position, he learned how to ink from Giordano.

At age 17, he met Mike Nasser, who had just received his first comics assignment, penciling a backup feature in Kamandi #45-46. Nasser allowed Rubinstein to practice inking on photocopies of his pencils for the story, and afterward showed the results to editor Gerry Conway, who then assigned Rubinstein to inking the story. Rubinstein is grateful  that editors assigned him work with Nasser as partners, pairing them with each other on every assignment.

In 1982, Rubinstein inked the acclaimed Wolverine limited series.

One of his most important works has been inking  The Official Handbook of the Marvel Universe over a span of twenty years, for which he holds a Guinness World Record of inking more pencilers than any other inker. Rubinstein recounted,

Among his extensive inking credits (which include more than 2,500 comic books), were work with Michael Golden on Micronauts, Jim Starlin's Warlock and Aquaman with Don Newton.  Later assignments included a mini-series for Dark Horse Comics called Archenemies, and co-inked issues of DC Comics's Ion mini-series and Green Arrow/Black Canary
In 2016 he was inducted into the Joe Sinnott Inkwell Hall of Fame.

Awards
In 2016, Rubinstein won one of the two annual Inkwell Awards Joe Sinnott Hall of Fame Awards. In his acceptance speech, he once again named Dick Giordano as his mentor.

References

External links

Josef Rubinstein at Claypool Comics

Josef Rubinstein Artwork Gallery at ComicArtFans.com

1958 births
Living people
German emigrants to the United States
Israeli emigrants to the United States
American artists
Marvel Comics people